The 1976–77 Sheffield Shield season was the 75th season of the Sheffield Shield, the domestic first-class cricket competition of Australia. Western Australia won the championship.

Table

Statistics

Most Runs
David Hookes 788

Most Wickets
Mick Malone 40

References

Sheffield Shield
Sheffield Shield
Sheffield Shield seasons